Creston Electric Instruments is a producer of vintage-style custom solid body and chambered electric guitars and basses. Known to players as "Crestons", these guitars are sometimes made using unconventional woods for bodies such as sugar pine and butternut. Lifelong musician and former carpenter, founder Creston Lea combined two passions to create Creston Electric Instruments in 2004 after several years of repairing and producing guitars in Burlington, Vermont. Creston Guitars are played by several notable musicians in the alt-country, country, blues and rock genre. Crestons have been made from centuries-old barn beams, spare instrument parts from customers, and common lumber yard 2x12 planks. While customers can specify unorthodox materials, many choose traditional hardwoods for solid body guitars such as ash, poplar, mahogany and basswood.

Notable players

 Luke Doucet - Self, Whitehorse, Sarah McLachlan
 Tom Blankenship - My Morning Jacket
 Charlie Parr
 Brian Henneman – The Bottle Rockets, Wilco, Uncle Tupelo
 Mark Spencer – Jay Farrar, Kelly Willis, Laura Cantrell, Blood Oranges, Lisa Loeb, Gob Iron
 Victor Krummenacher - Camper Van Beethoven, Monks of Doom, Self
 Noel Gallagher
 Chuck Prophet – Self, Green on Red, Kelly Willis
 Tom Heyman – Self, Go To Blazes, The Court & Spark
 Liz Cooper - Liz Cooper & The Stampede
 Henry Kaiser
 Scott Metzger
 Caroline Rose
 Keith Voegele – The Bottle Rockets
 Tony Gilkyson – Self, X, Lone Justice, Chuck E. Weiss, Bob Dylan, Alice Cooper
 Anders Parker – Self, Varnaline, Space Needle (band), New Multitudes, Gob Iron, Mascott
 Eric Heywood – Son Volt, Minnie Driver, Ray LaMontagne, The Pretenders, Joe Henry, Richard Buckner, Mandy Moore
 Tim Bluhm – The Mother Hips
 Noah Crowther - Waylon Speed
 MC Taylor – The Court & Spark, Hiss Golden Messenger
 Gabrielle Douglas – The Cush
 Zack Hickman – Josh Ritter
 Gaby Hoffmann – (actress) Everyone Says I Love You, Now and Then, You Can Count on Me, 200 Cigarettes, Uncle Buck, Field of Dreams
 Tao Rodríguez-Seeger – The Mammals
 Ian MacKaye – The Evens, Fugazi, Minor Threat
 Johnny Hickman - Cracker (band)
 Jimmy Ryan – Self, Blood Oranges, Laura Cantrell, Morphine, Catie Curtis, Warren Zevon
 Jaleel Bunton – TV on the Radio
 Jeph Jacques - (cartoonist) Deathmøle
 Val McCallum
 James Walbourne – The Pretenders, The Pogues, Jerry Lee Lewis, Pernice Brothers, Linda Thompson
 Jay Farrar - Son Volt, Uncle Tupelo, Gob Iron, New Multitudes
 Marco Pirroni - Adam Ant, Adam and the Ants, Sinéad O'Connor, Siouxsie and the Banshees
 Chad Urmston - State Radio, Dispatch (band)
 Adam Ant - Adam Ant, Adam and the Ants
 Will Johnson - Centro-Matic, South San Gabriel, Monsters of Folk, New Multitudes
 David Bryant - Godspeed You! Black Emperor
 Kris Delmhorst - self
 Mike Bones - self
 Mark Erelli - Kris Delmhorst, Lori McKenna, Catie Curtis
 John Murry - self

References

External links
 Official website

Guitar manufacturing companies of the United States